Opsigalea blanchardi is a species of moth in the family Noctuidae (the owlet moths). It is found in North America.

The MONA or Hodges number for Opsigalea blanchardi is 10216.

References

Further reading

 
 
 

Cuculliinae
Articles created by Qbugbot
Moths described in 1966